Timothy Joseph Leiper (born July 19, 1966) is an American professional baseball coach and former manager.  He was the first-base coach of the Toronto Blue Jays of Major League Baseball from 2014 until 2018.

Leiper, a former outfielder, had a 12-season (1985–96) minor league playing career in the farm systems of the Detroit Tigers, Pittsburgh Pirates, New York Mets and Kansas City Royals, batting .273 with 40 home runs in 1,166 games and 3,910 at bats. The native of Whittier, California, attended Brea Olinda High School. His older brother, Dave Leiper was a major league pitcher for 8 seasons.

Career
Leiper's coaching career began while he was still an active player: he spent part of the 1992 season as an assistant baseball coach for North Carolina State University. In 1996, Leiper became a coach in the professional ranks, in the New York Mets' organization. In , he managed the Jacksonville Suns, the Marlins' Double-A affiliate, where he led them to the 2010 Southern League championship. He then served as the Marlins' roving minor league defensive coordinator in 2011 and 2012. In , he was senior advisor for minor league operations for the Toronto Blue Jays before his promotion to Blue Jays manager John Gibbons' staff for 2014, his first year in Major League Baseball after 29 years as a minor league player, manager and instructor.

Outside North America, Leiper played for Cañeros de Los Mochis of the Mexican Pacific Winter League in 1993, and Águilas Cibaeñas in 1996, where his team won the Dominican Professional Baseball League championship. In 1999–2000 he coached for Pastora in the Venezuelan Professional Baseball League, as well as Aguilas, in 2007–08 in the Dominican winter league. Aguilas won both the Dominican championship and the Caribbean World Series.

Previously an offseason resident of Ottawa, Leiper has also been a coach on the 2004 Canadian Olympic team, and Canada's 2006, 2009, and 2013 World Baseball Classic squads. He was also a part of the Baseball Canada staff that won bronze medals at both the 2008 and 2011 Baseball World Cups and the gold medal in the 2011 Pan-American Games.

After John Gibbons parted ways with the Blue Jays after the 2018 season, Leiper was fired on November 3.

See also
Baseball at the 2004 Summer Olympics – Team squads
2006 World Baseball Classic rosters
2009 World Baseball Classic rosters
2013 World Baseball Classic rosters

References

External links

1966 births
Living people
Altoona Curve managers
American expatriate baseball players in Canada
Baseball coaches from California
Binghamton Mets players
Bristol Tigers players
Buffalo Bisons (minor league) players
Canada national baseball team people
Carolina Mudcats players
Glens Falls Tigers players
Jacksonville Suns players
Lakeland Tigers players
London Tigers players
Major League Baseball first base coaches
Memphis Chicks players
NC State Wolfpack baseball coaches
Toledo Mud Hens players
Toronto Blue Jays coaches